The General Convention of the Assemblies of God in Brazil is a Pentecostal Christian denomination in Brazil. It is affiliated with the Assemblies of God, specifically the Assembleias de Deus in Brazil. Its headquarters are in Rio de Janeiro.

History
The General Convention of the Assemblies of God in Brazil has its origins in the mission work of Daniel Berg and Gunnar Vingren, two Swedish Pentecostal missionaries who arrived in Belém, Pará, in 1910. The denomination was officially founded in 1930. In 2003, it had 280,000 churches and 3.5 million members.

References

External links
 Official Website

Brazil
Evangelicalism in Brazil